Đức Hòa is a rural district (huyện) of Long An province in the Mekong Delta region of Vietnam. As of 2003 the district had a population of 199,181. The district covers an area of 426 km². The district capital lies at Hậu Nghĩa.

Divisions
The district is subdivided into 20 commune-level subdivisions, including the townships of: Hậu Nghĩa, Đức Hòa and Hiệp Hòa, and the rural communes of: Lộc Giang, An Ninh Đông, An Ninh Tây, Tân Mỹ, Hiệp Hòa, Tân Phú, Hoà Khánh Tây, Hoà Khánh Đông, Hoà Khánh Nam, Đức Lập Thượng, Đức Lập Hạ, Đức Hoà Thượng, Đức Hoà Đông, Đức Hoà Hạ, Mỹ Hạnh Bắc, Mỹ Hạnh Nam and Hựu Thạnh.

References

Districts of Long An province